Fordtown is an unincorporated community in Sullivan County, Tennessee, United States, located south of Colonial Heights. This community's name was adopted due to the number of people with the Ford surname who lived in the area. It is accessed by the road named after it, Fordtown Road.

References 

Unincorporated communities in Sullivan County, Tennessee
Unincorporated communities in Tennessee